Sentinel Gap is a water gap formed by the Columbia River in the Saddle Mountains, near Mattawa in Washington state. The gap is "a water gap where erosion by the Columbia River was able to keep pace with folding, faulting and uplifting across the Saddle Mountain anticline". During Ice Age floods in which waters from the Channeled Scablands found passage to the Pacific Ocean here and at Wallula Gap, this opening was "repeatedly reamed out, which probably widened and steepened the walls of the gap". Strandlines from the floods can be seen on the basalt walls of the gap.

SR 243 runs along the east side of the river through the gap, and the river is spanned by the Beverly Railroad Bridge. The gap is located between the Wanapum and Priest Rapids dams.

References

Sources

External links

Columbia River
Landforms of Kittitas County, Washington
Water gaps of Washington